Azuqua is a cloud-based integration and automation company headquartered in Seattle, Washington. As such, they integrate SaaS applications and create automations that are designed to eliminate manual work. Azuqua's platform has the ability to set up workflows between multiple applications so disparate teams can stay in the loop. Azuqua's customers include companies such as Charles Schwab, General Electric, General Motors, HubSpot, and Airbnb.

History 
Nikhil Hasija and Craig Unger founded Azuqua in 2011.

In 2013, the team participated in Techstars Microsoft's Windows Azure Accelerator, a Seattle-based incubator that helps entrepreneurs gain traction through deep mentor engagement and rapid iteration cycles.

Azuqua announced in 2014 that they have received their Series A funding from Ignition Partners which amounted to $5 million. 

2017 included a 65% growth in new customers, a doubling of new SaaS connectors, and a 50% growth in overall employee headcount. Azuqua also received their Series B funding which totaled to $10.8 million. This funding was led by Insight Ventures Partners, with DFJ and Ignition Partners also joining the round

As of March 2018, Azuqua hired Todd Owens as CEO. Owens was previously CEO of Appuri, a customer data platform. Hasija has transitioned to the role of Chief Product Officer.

Azuqua also hired on Dan Kogan who has taken on the role of Chief Marketing Officer. Kogan previously worked at Tableau, a BI and analytics company, as a Senior Director of Product Marketing.

Product Description/Features 

 Logic Library: Logic functions that can be used for data processing, branching logic, and business rules
 Drag and Drop Visual Designer: No-code visual designer
 Use of API's for each cloud service a business is using to allow the various apps to communicate and share data
 API Publishing: Integrations and automations can be made available as secure endpoints, webhooks, or open services
 Connector Builder: Build a connector to an application
 Connector Library: Pre-built connectors to SaaS applications
 Error Handling: Automations that execute when an error is detected

References

External links 
 https://azuqua.com/

2011 establishments in Washington (state)
American companies established in 2011
Privately held companies based in Washington (state)
Data management